G-Dragon is a South Korean rapper, singer-songwriter, record producer, and leader of Korean boy band Big Bang. He is widely known to be the main songwriter and producer of the group, penning all of the group's major hits, including "Lies", "Last Farewell", and "Haru Haru" which is one of the most digitally downloaded songs in Korean music history. The Korea Times has called him a "genius singer-songwriter", citing that his songs became instant hits and anthems for young people around the country. In 2008, G-Dragon became the youngest person to be listed on The 10 Greatest Korean Composers at the age of 20. He was named the Top Songwriter of 2012 by Melon. As of July 2022, the Korea Music Copyright Association has 175 songs listed under his name. G-Dragon has written 23 number one songs on the Gaon Digital Chart.

Big Bang albums

Solo albums

Other work

References

 Where it is not indicated separately, source is the respective album jacket and the database of KOMCA.

G-Dragon, List of songs written by